Shri Krishna Memorial Hall (popularly known as S K Memorial Hall) is a multipurpose arena located in the Gandhi Maidan area of Patna, Bihar. It was built in honour of the first Chief Minister of Bihar, Sri Krishna Sinha. Originally completed in 1976 with a seating capacity of 2,000, the centre has undergone numerous renovations and expansions. It is second largest auditorium in Bihar. It can also be used for conventions, trade shows, concert performances, banquets and other events.

See also

 Patna International Convention Centre

References

Tourist attractions in Patna
Buildings and structures in Patna
Concert halls in India
Convention centres in Patna
Buildings and structures completed in 1972
1972 establishments in Bihar
20th-century architecture in India